Antirrhea is a Neotropical genus of butterflies from the family Nymphalidae.

Species
The genus contains the following species, arranged alphabetically:
Antirrhea adoptiva Weymer, 1909
Antirrhea archaea Hübner, [1822]
Antirrhea geryon C. & R. Felder, 1862
Antirrhea geryonides Weymer, 1909
Antirrhea hela C. & R. Felder, 1862
Antirrhea kiefferi Plantrou, 1965
Antirrhea miltiades (Fabricius, 1793)
Antirrhea murena Staudinger, 1885
Antirrhea ornata Butler, 1870
Antirrhea phasiane Butler, 1870
Antirrhea philaretes Felder, 1862
Antirrhea philoctetes (Linnaeus, 1758)
Antirrhea pterocopha Salvin & Godman, 1868
Antirrhea taygetina Butler, 1868
Antirrhea ulei Strand, 1912
Antirrhea undulata Hering & Hopp, 1925
Antirrhea watkinsi Rosenberg & Talbot, 1914

References

Morphinae
Nymphalidae of South America
Nymphalidae genera
Taxa named by Jacob Hübner